Dudamira is a genus of flies in the family Sepsidae.

Species
Dudamira abyssinica (Duda, 1926)

References

Sepsidae
Diptera of Africa
Brachycera genera